Tatiane Zaqui Ferreira da Silva (born February 18, 1994), simply known as Tati Zaqui, is a Brazilian singer-songwriter and dancer, influenced by the carioca, ostentação and ousadia subgenres of Brazilian funk. Known for her bright blue hair and outspoken stances, she reached fame in 2014 with the hit "Parará Tibum".

Biography
Zaqui was born in São Caetano do Sul, São Paulo on February 18, 1994, and raised in Santo André. She first began writing songs with 7 years old, and initially studied to be a flight attendant. Her musical career officially began in 2013, when she uploaded to YouTube the song "Salve, MC Kauan", a tribute to the eponymous musician; it reached over 15,000 views in a day after he shared it in his Facebook page. She counts MC Kauan as one of her major influences, alongside Dulce María and Justin Bieber, for whom she would also write the tribute "Rolê com Bieber".

It wasn't until 2014 when Zaqui reached nationwide fame with the song "Parará Tibum", a "sexy cover" of the song "Heigh-Ho" from the 1937 Disney film Snow White and the Seven Dwarfs. "Parará Tibum" went viral after a video of actress Bruna Marquezine dancing to the song surfaced on the Internet, prompting Zaqui to come up with the "Parará Tibum Challenge", encouraging people to record themselves dancing to the song; participants included Anitta, Preta Gil and Cláudia Leitte. A music video, produced by KondZilla, was released in 2015 and reached 6 million views in less than two weeks; however, the song was later removed from all platforms due to allegations of copyright infringement from Disney.

In 2015 she released the song "Água na Boca", travelling to Cancún for the shooting of its music video. The same year, in July, she posed for Playboy Brasil.

In 2016 she released a collaborative track with singer Lexa, "Movimento".

In September 2019, alongside Dadá Boladão and OIK, she released the song "Surtada", described as "a foray into brega funk".

On August 2, 2020, she released the duet "Aguenta" with rapper Pelé Milflows. In 2021 she and Milflows collaborated once more, alongside fellow rappers Mikezin, SóCiro and Olivia, for the single "Baila Mais 2". Later that year, on July 30, she released the collaboration "Amiga Não Julga" alongside Karen Kardasha and Renato Shippee.

In March 2022 Zaqui opened up an account on content subscription service Privacy, acquiring over 15,000 subscribers in less than three weeks. Later in September she was chosen as a contestant of the fourteenth season of RecordTV's reality show A Fazenda; she would become the fourth contestant to be eliminated on October 13.

Personal life
Zaqui is bisexual, and came out openly in 2015. In a 2016 interview she stated she was "dating someone", later revealed to be her life-long idol MC Kauan; they announced their engagement in February 2018, but eventually broke up six months later. In 2019 she admitted to have had a brief affair with Neymar during the Carnival season, claiming it "was good"; subsequently, she would also have affairs with Gabriel Jesus, surfer Gabriel Medina, funk singers MC Don Juan, MC Orochi and Biel (the latter a decision she "later regretted"), and Mayla Araújo, sister of Big Brother Brasil 17 contestant Emilly Araújo.

As of May 2019 Zaqui is in a relationship with footballer Yan, brother of Yuri, who played for Santos and Audax.

In July 2016 she was forced to cancel a performance after being admitted to an hospital under suspects of a viral disease.

On November 30, 2020, Zaqui had to undergo an emergency surgery after suffering from symptoms of endometriosis.

Awards and nominations

References

External links
 

1994 births
Living people
Brazilian female dancers
People from São Caetano do Sul
Musicians from São Paulo (state)
Funk carioca musicians
Brazilian hip hop musicians
Brazilian pop singers
21st-century Brazilian women singers
Bisexual women
Bisexual singers
Brazilian LGBT singers
Brazilian LGBT songwriters
Bisexual songwriters
Bisexual dancers
Brazilian women singer-songwriters
LGBT people in Latin music
Women in Latin music